The La Raya mountain range (Spanish for the line, the limits, the border) is situated in the Andes of Peru. It extends in a northeasterly direction approximately between 14º 20’ and 14º 33’S and  70º 57’ and 71º 02’W  for about 10 km. It is located in the Cusco Region as well as in the Puno Region, northwest of the Peruvian Altiplano and Lake Titicaca, near the La Raya pass.

Mountains 
One of the highest peaks of the range is Chimpulla. Other mountains are listed below:

 Yana Khuchilla, 
 Chinchina, 
 Muskaya,  
 Kuntur Quta, 
 Qillqa, 
 Awkar Utaña,  
 Huch'uy K'uchu, 
 Hatun Awkara, 
 Kunka, 
 Wila Quta, 
 Yanaqucha,   
 Mamaniri,  
 Qullqini, 
 Chawpi Tiyana, 
 Hatun Ichhuna Kunka, 
 Huch'uy Awkara, 
 Puka Urqu,  
 Taruja Marka,  
 Yana Ranra,  
 Hatun Wasi, 
 Inka Kancha, 
 Ñiq'i Quta, 
 Silluta, 
 Yaritani,

See also 
 PeruRail

References

Mountain ranges of Peru
Mountain ranges of Cusco Region
Mountain ranges of Puno Region